Opus Capital is a venture capital firm focusing on early stage investments in information technology in the United States and Israel.

Opus Capital has more than $1 billion under management and is currently investing from its sixth fund. Over the past three decades — since the firm's roots at Weiss, Peck & Greer Venture Partners — the firm has been involved in more than 80 successful outcomes, including 50 IPOs.

References

External links

Venture capital firms of the United States
Companies based in Menlo Park, California
Financial services companies established in 2005